Red Sea is a studio album by Augustus Pablo released in 1998, containing material recorded between 1970 and 1973 and was produced by Herman Chin Loy. The music on the album is among the earliest instances of Pablo's revolutionary use of the melodica as a viable musical instrument. Chin Loy is often credited as being an influential figure in the discovery and nurturing of Pablo's talent.

Track listing
 "Red Sea" (Swaby) 
 "Iggy" (Swaby) 
 "East of the River Nile" (Swaby) 
 "Soul Vibration" (Swaby) 
 "Song of the East" (Swaby)
 "Uganda" (Swaby) 
 "Youth Man" (Swaby) 
 "Invasion" (Swaby) 
 "I Man" (Swaby) 
 "African Rock" (Swaby) 
 "African Zulu" (Swaby)
 "405" (Swaby) 
 "Reggae in the Fields" (Swaby)
 "Darker Shade of Red" (Swaby)

Personnel

 Augustus Pablo - keyboards, Melodica
 Uziah "Sticky" Thompson - drums
 Aston Barrett - Bass guitar, Guitar
 Clive Chin - Percussion
 Carlton "Santa" Davis - drums
 Ranchie McLean - Guitar
 Herman Chin Loy - Backing Vocals
 Val Douglas - Bass guitar
 Mikey Richards - drums
 Alva Lewis - Guitar
 Ranford "Ranny" Williams - Guitar
 Mikey Chung - Guitar
 Glen Adams - keyboards
 Lloyd Charmers - keyboards
 Geoffrey Chung - keyboards
 Bobby Ellis - Trumpet
 Vin Gordon - Trombone
 Tommy McCook - Saxophone

External links
 Roots Archives
 Augustus Pablo And Friends* - The Red Sea - Discogs

Augustus Pablo albums
1998 debut albums
Aquarius Records (Canada) albums
Albums produced by Herman Chin Loy